The Old Dauphin Way Historic District is a historic district in the city of Mobile, Alabama, United States.  It was named for Dauphin Way, now known as Dauphin Street, which bisects the center of the district from east to west.   The district is roughly bounded by Broad Street on the east, Springhill Avenue on the north, Government Street on the south, and Houston Avenue on the west.  Covering  and containing 1466 contributing buildings, Old Dauphin Way is the largest historic district in Mobile.

Although most of the district contains working-class frame houses, large and ornate mansions are found along the main thoroughfares.  The contributing buildings range in age from the mid-19th to the early 20th century.  Architectural styles include Greek Revival, Gothic Revival, Italianate, Queen Anne, Colonial Revival, Tudor Revival, and American Foursquare.

History
The Old Dauphin Way District is situated on portions of what was once the Price and Espejo tracts, early Spanish land grants to the west of colonial Mobile.  The area began to first be developed during the 1830s and 1840s.  This early development mostly comprised residential estates along the roads leading from downtown to the village of Spring Hill.  These included Spring Hill Road (now Spring Hill Avenue), Spring Hill Shell Road (now Old Shell Road), and Dauphin Way (now Dauphin Street).  The district was placed on the National Register of Historic Places on August 30, 1984.

References

External links

Old Dauphin Way Association

Historic districts in Mobile, Alabama
National Register of Historic Places in Mobile, Alabama
Historic districts on the National Register of Historic Places in Alabama